Miller Grove is an unincorporated town in Hopkins County, Texas, with an estimated population in 2000 of 115. The Miller Grove Independent School District serves area students.

References

Populated places in Hopkins County, Texas
Unincorporated communities in Hopkins County, Texas
Unincorporated communities in Texas